The Central California Traction Company   is a Class III short-line railroad operating in the northern San Joaquin Valley, in San Joaquin County, California.  It is owned jointly by the Union Pacific and BNSF Railway.

Service
The railroad operates between Stockton and Lodi. CCT also operates the Stockton Public Belt Railway around the Port of Stockton.

It connects to the Stockton Terminal and Eastern Railroad company freight lines that serve greater Stockton. Several miles of the CCT track through Acampo are being used to store rolling stock, primarily Centerbeam flatcars that carry lumber, as of 2009.

History
The Central California Traction Company was founded on August 7, 1905, as an alternative city streetcar line to the Stockton Electric Railroad.  The company soon had greater ambitions and became a 1,200-volt DC electric interurban railway, opening a line from Stockton to Lodi in 1907, and reaching Sacramento by 1910.

In 1928, the railroad was sold by the original owners and was then jointly purchased by the Atchison, Topeka and Santa Fe Railroad, the Southern Pacific Railroad and the Western Pacific Railroad.

The railroad operated over the same line from Lodi and Stockton to Sacramento until 1998, when service to Sacramento was suspended. Currently the tracks remain between Stockton and Sacramento, being kept for future operational options.

One of the Central California Traction Company train stations survives in Acampo, just north of Lodi.  This station was converted into a residence, with interior walls and an expansion.

Locomotive roster

See also

List of California Interurban Railroads
Sacramento Northern Railway
Stockton Terminal and Eastern Railroad

References

Notes

Bibliography

External links

Official Central California Traction Company−CCT website
Comprehensive Trainweb.org: CCT Site
Trainweb.org: Current CCT Locomotive Roster
Cencalrails.railfan.net: Photographs of CCT
Donsdepot.net: Photographs of CCT
Western Pacific Railroad Museum — home of CCT Caboose #24.
Tidewatersouthern.com: CCT Steeple Cab locomotive #100.
 Davesrailpix.com: Photograph collection of all interurbans — includes CCT and TS.

California railroads
Interurban railways in California
Transportation in Sacramento, California
Transportation in Sacramento County, California
Transportation in San Joaquin County, California
Lodi, California
Economy of Stockton, California
Spin-offs of the BNSF Railway
Spin-offs of the Union Pacific Railroad
Railway companies established in 1905
1905 establishments in California
American companies established in 1905